The Ukrainian stickleback (Pungitius platygaster) also known as the Caspian ninespine stickleback, southern ninespine stickleback, and Aral ninespine stickleback, is a species of fish in the family Gasterosteidae. It is found in Afghanistan, Bulgaria, Iran, Kazakhstan, Moldova, Romania, Russia, Serbia,  Montenegro, and Ukraine (Black Sea, Sea of Azov, Aral Sea and Caspian Sea basins).

A combination of two characters: lack of caudal peduncle keel, presence of large lateral scutes. It is similar to P. hellenicus with the following differences. Body darker than P. hellenicus (juvenile specimens from Iran show the same color as P. hellenicus). All the bones well ossified, cranial bones and pelvic bones highly sculptured. Pelvic girdle present with one spine and one small soft ray on each side. Dorsal spines 8–11, inclined alternatively to left and right. Last spine slightly longer than the others, which are relatively uniform. Dorsal soft rays 6–10; anal soft rays 6–9; gill rakers 9–11; bony scutes 29–32 with 7-12 large lateral scutes; total vertebrae 29–31; precaudal vertebrae usually 13. Caudal fin truncated.

References

Sources
Keivany, Y. 1996. Taxonomic revision of the genus Pungitius with emphasis on P. hellenicus. MSc thesis. Department of Biological Sciences, University of Alberta. Edmonton. 98 pp.
Keivany, Y., and J.S. Nelson. 2000. Taxonomic review of the genus Pungitius, ninespine sticklebacks (Teleostei, Gasterosteidae). Cybium, 24(2): 107–122.
Keivany, Y. and J.S. Nelson. 2004. Phylogenetic relationships of sticklebacks (Gasterosteidae), with emphasis on ninespine sticklebacks (Pungitius spp.). Behaviour, 141(11/12): 1485–1497.

Pungitius
Fish of Europe
Fish of the Black Sea
Fish of Central Asia
Fish of the Caspian Sea
Fish of Russia
Fish described in 1859
Taxonomy articles created by Polbot